Ewighausen is an Ortsgemeinde – a community belonging to a Verbandsgemeinde – in the Westerwaldkreis in Rhineland-Palatinate, Germany. The community belongs to the Verbandsgemeinde of Selters, a kind of collective municipality.

Geography

The community lies 5 km east of Selters in the Westerwald on Landesstraße  L 303 between the Westerwald Lake District and the Kannenbäckerland.

History
In 1397, Ewighausen had its first documentary mention. The name's spelling has changed over the centuries from Ebichusin to Ebeckusen und Ewighusen and then into Ewighausen. In 1972, in the course of municipal restructuring, the Verbandsgemeinde of Selters was founded.

Politics

The municipal council is made up of 6 council members, including the honorary and presiding mayor (Ortsbürgermeister), who were elected in a majority vote in a municipal election on 7 June 2009.

Economy and infrastructure

The community lies west of Bundesstraße 8 leading from Limburg an der Lahn to Siegburg. The nearest Autobahn interchange is Mogendorf on the A 3 (Cologne–Frankfurt). The nearest InterCityExpress stop is the railway station at Montabaur on the Cologne-Frankfurt high-speed rail line.

References

External links
Ewighausen in the collective municipality’s Web pages 

Municipalities in Rhineland-Palatinate
Westerwaldkreis